KFUL may refer to:

 Fullerton Municipal Airport (ICAO code KFUL)
 KFUL-LD, a low-power television station (channel 23, virtual 57) licensed to serve San Luis Obispo, California, United States